Sean Patrick Flanery (born October 11, 1965) is an American actor, author, and martial artist. He is known for playing Connor MacManus in The Boondock Saints (1999) and its sequel The Boondock Saints II: All Saints Day (2009), Greg Stillson in the USA Network television series The Dead Zone, Jeremy "Powder" Reed in Powder (1995), Indiana Jones in the ABC television series The Young Indiana Jones Chronicles, as well as Bobby Dagen in Saw: The Final Chapter (2010). He is also known for his role as Sam Gibson on the CBS soap opera The Young and the Restless in 2011. He starred in Devil's Carnival, a short film which was screened on tour beginning in April, 2012. In 2016, he published his first novel, Jane Two, a coming-of-age story drawing inspiration from his own childhood and early experiences.

Early life
Flanery was born on October 11, 1965 in Lake Charles, Louisiana, and was raised in Houston, Texas. His mother, Genie (née LeDoux), is a real estate broker, and his father, Paul Flanery, is a medical equipment salesman. His ancestry includes Irish, Cajun (French), and English. After attending Awty International School, Flanery graduated from Dulles High School in Sugar Land, and attended the University of St. Thomas in Houston.

Acting career
Flanery started acting in college after he joined an acting class to meet a girl on whom he had a crush. He later moved to Los Angeles, California, to pursue his acting career. Since 1988 he has appeared in over 53 films, including Powder, Simply Irresistible, and D-Tox. He is best known, however, for playing the Indiana Jones in The Young Indiana Jones Chronicles and Connor MacManus in The Boondock Saints.  He had a brief role as the ascended being, Orlin, in the Stargate SG-1 episode "Ascension". He appeared on the TV show The Dead Zone in the role of Vice-President, Greg Stillson, until its cancellation. Flanery also appeared in an installment of Showtime's Masters of Horror playing a town sheriff who later became one of the antagonistic entity's possessed hosts in the episode "The Damned Thing". In March 2010 he was cast in the lead role in the sci-fi horror film Mongolian Death Worm. He also had a supporting role in 2010's Saw 3D. Flanery appeared in The Black Keys' music video "Howlin' For You", which was released on February 10, 2011. In April 2011 Flanery headed to the CBS soap The Young and the Restless, playing the part of Sam, Sharon Newman's boyfriend from New Mexico.

Flanery won the award for Outstanding Guest Performer in a Digital Daytime Drama Series at the 46th Annual Daytime Creative Arts Emmy Awards for his role as Ty Garrett on The Bay.

Personal life
He once had a dog named Donut who is named after the donuts she devoured shortly after being adopted by Flanery.

Flanery won the 1997 Toyota Pro-Celebrity Race  at the Toyota Grand Prix of Long Beach as the celebrity driver; the "Alfonso Ribeiro rule" (whereby if a celebrity wins, he must be classified as a professional the next time) forced him to "defend" his title as a professional driver under TGPLB rules, and he won the 1998 race as a professional driver.

Flanery is also a 3rd degree black belt in Brazilian Jiu-Jitsu, which he teaches. He placed first in the Master 1/ Blue/ Male/ Light division at the 2003 American National IBJJF Jiu-jitsu Championship and the 2003 Pan Jiu-jitsu IBJJF Championship by the International Brazilian Jiu-Jitsu Federation. Flanery indicated in an interview that, at one point, he considered competing in mixed martial arts, saying "If it didn’t come around so late in my life, that would’ve 100 percent been my trajectory."

Filmography

Film

Television

References

External links

 

20th-century American male actors
21st-century American male actors
Male actors from Louisiana
American male film actors
American male television actors
American people of English descent
American people of Irish descent
American practitioners of Brazilian jiu-jitsu
Cajun people
People awarded a black belt in Brazilian jiu-jitsu
Dulles High School (Sugar Land, Texas) alumni
Living people
Male actors from Houston
People from Lake Charles, Louisiana
University of St. Thomas (Texas) alumni
Barber Pro Series drivers
Year of birth missing (living people)